The Equalizer is an American spy thriller television series, originally airing on CBS from September 18, 1985, to August 24, 1989, and co-created by Michael Sloan and Richard Lindheim. It starred Edward Woodward as a retired intelligence agent with a mysterious past, who uses the skills from his former career to exact justice on behalf of innocent people who find themselves in dangerous circumstances, while sometimes also dealing with people from his past in covert operations who want to pull him back in or settle old scores.

The concept has been rebooted twice with a pair of movies (in 2014 and 2018) starring Denzel Washington slated to be followed up by a third film, and a re-imagined 2021 TV series starring Queen Latifah as Robyn McCall.

Series plot elements
The series stars British actor Edward Woodward as Robert McCall, a former covert operations officer of an unnamed US government intelligence organization, which was often referred to simply as "the Agency" or "the Company", who tries to atone for his past by offering, usually free of charge, his services as a troubleshooter, a protector, and an investigator.

People in need found him through a newspaper classified ad: "Got a problem? Odds against you? Call the Equalizer: 212 555 4200." When he began the business in the pilot episode, the nickname "Equalizer" was revealed as bestowed on him by an operative named "Brahms", played by Jerry Stiller.

Aided by a group of sometimes mysterious contacts, some of whom date back to his spying days, McCall traverses the streets of New York City, delivering justice upon bullies, corrupt police officials and politicians, hoodlums, mobsters, rapists, racists, murderers, kidnappers, drug dealers, and other "truly deserving" people. "Please do not do anything you will never live to regret," he tells one villain.

His contacts were also prone to human foibles that ranged from egoism to domestic problems.

Many episodes focused on McCall interacting with "Control" (played by Robert Lansing), the unnamed head of the Manhattan office of the secret organization for which McCall used to work. As a general rule, however, the people responding to the newspaper ad were unremarkable, average, and unknown.

McCall's Jaguar XJ saloon car, weapons, and other gadgetry at times featured significantly as elements in the plot.

Cast and characters

Main
 Edward Woodward as Robert McCall: A veteran operative of The Company who becomes disillusioned with sacrificing ordinary people for the perceived greater good. He quits and takes out a newspaper advert offering his services to those who need it as The Equalizer. McCall himself is divorced, a "lost dad" long estranged from his son, Scott (William Zabka). Scott comes back into his life as a young adult who is at first bitterly critical of his father's world, but then becomes drawn into that world to the dismay of both of his parents. McCall also lost a woman he was in love with, a fellow operative named Manon Brevard, and discovers that she had secretly given birth to his daughter Yvette. McCall appears to be independently wealthy, as although he almost never takes payment for his work, he owns a high-end apartment, is always well dressed and drives a Jaguar XJ6 car (registered 5809-AUG). He enjoys classical music (playing the piano himself), fine wine and dining and is occasionally seen dating and trying to live a "normal" life, only for work or his past to get in the way. His father, William, was a British Army officer who was killed in Egypt in 1952 when McCall was 19 and also an army officer. His mother was a working class American entertainer and his father was disinherited by his family and shunned by his regiment for being seen to be marrying beneath himself. McCall had a strained relationship with his father, whom he blamed for remaining overseas and leaving him at boarding school while his mother was dying. He was also guilt-ridden at his various actions during the Cold War, notably helping to establish the dictatorship in Chile and working with South Africa's apartheid regime in Angola. Woodward was nominated for an Emmy for Outstanding Actor in a Drama Series four years in a row but never won, and was also nominated in 1986 and 1987 for the Golden Globe Award for Best Actor – Television Series Drama, winning in 1986.
 Keith Szarabajka as Mickey Kostmayer (Also starring, 56 episodes): A former Navy SEAL, who was in the brig for a crime he did not commit until McCall cleared him and recommended he join The Company. Often seen surveilling suspects or protecting witnesses. Always laconic, he is from Houston, Texas, of Polish/American origin and served in Cambodia during the Vietnam War, claiming to have stayed awake during one mission for 96 hours straight. He is seen to enjoy fishing in his free time, is a fan of the Knicks basketball team and bubble-gum and builds models out of matchsticks. His brother is a priest, also in the city, and needs the help of McCall and Mickey in one episode. While McCall is almost always dressed in a suit, Mickey is usually seen in jeans and wearing a watch cap and army overcoat. A black Dodge van is his usual mode of transport.

Recurring
 Robert Lansing as Control (29 episodes). A contemporary of McCall's in The Company who has risen to a senior rank; he and McCall are usually friendly, although at times Control's focus on the mission causes friction with McCall's desire to avoid collateral damage. Although McCall does not always agree with Control's methods, he usually helps his old friend when younger and even more ruthless agents try to force him out. For his part Control allows McCall to utilize Company men like Mickey, Jimmy and Sterno provided they are not on assignment. Known for his trademark bowties. 
 Mark Margolis as Jimmy (16 episodes). Another Company veteran and an expert in surveillance. Usually brought in by McCall when high-tech bugs or wiretaps are required. He is divorced and almost always has a story about his ex-wife to tell McCall. Abandoned by his father at age 6, Jimmy is part of the Big Brother project, mentoring troubled kids. 
 William Zabka as Scott McCall (12 episodes). McCall's estranged son when the series begins, their growing relationship is one of the recurring themes throughout the series. Scott is an accomplished musician but is drawn more and more deeply in to his father's world as the series progresses. Scott also knows of the kinship between himself, Yvette, and their father although McCall has sworn him to secrecy.  (In season 2, Scott meets and later dates Jenny Morrow, played by Lori Loughlin.)
 Chad Redding as Sgt. Alice Shepard (11 episodes). An NYPD detective who often assists McCall, recognizing that he can take action where she cannot.
 Richard Jordan as Harley Gage (10 episodes). Another disillusioned Company veteran, Gage was brought in by Richard Dyson (played by Robert Mitchum) to track down McCall when he goes missing in "Mission McCall", and ends up staying on and helping people with McCall. This was done to lighten the load on Woodward after he suffered a heart attack, although Keith Szarabajka was featured in only five of the episodes with Jordan.
 Maureen Anderman as Pete O'Phelan (9 episodes). The widow of a former colleague of McCall's, and a former operative herself. She owns a bar that McCall and Mickey frequent, and also helps out with their missions from time to time.
 Ron O'Neal as Lt. Isadore Smalls (7 episodes). An NYPD detective who assists McCall.
 Irving Metzman as Sterno (7 episodes). Another Company man, specializing in computers and finance. He is often seen eating, particularly fast food, which generally annoys McCall's more refined tastes.
 Steven Williams as Lt. Jefferson Burnett (6 episodes). An NYPD detective in the first season, who is aware of McCall's past and is initially distrustful of him.
 Robert Joy as Jacob Stock (5 episodes). A Company operative who botches his first assignment with McCall, but redeems himself.  He occasionally resurfaces to assist McCall.
 Melissa Sue Anderson as Yvette Marcel (4 episodes). The daughter of McCall's former love Manon, she believes that Phillip Marcel (played by Anthony Zerbe) is her father but he later reveals to McCall that she is his daughter, a fact McCall keeps to himself and tells Marcel that he must be the one to tell her, which he finally does after being fatally wounded by an old enemy. Anderson is the real-life wife of series co-creator Michael Sloan.
 Eddie Jones as Lt. Brannigan (4 episodes). An NYPD detective in the fourth season.
 Ray Baker as Dana (3 episodes). An agent of The Company who occasionally aids McCall in his investigations. Jovial, generous and good-hearted, he is nonetheless an expert in the seedier side of New York life with a comprehensive knowledge of the city's sex industry.
 Joe Morton as Carter Brock (3 episodes).  A Vietnam veteran and explosives expert who appears in the fourth season. McCall calls him "Brockie".
 Charles Cioffi as Lt. Kramer (3 episodes).  An NYPD detective in the second and third seasons.
 Earl Hindman as Lt. Elmer (3 episodes). An NYPD detective in the second season.
 Saul Rubinek as Jason Masur (3 episodes). A Company official who interferes with McCall and pushes Control around.
 Austin Pendleton as Jonah (3 episodes). A computer expert who helps McCall.

Notable guest stars

The show had quite a number of notable guest stars, many of whom became major stars within a few years of their appearances. Eight-year-old Macaulay Culkin appeared in one episode as a kidnap victim. Nine-year-old Melissa Joan Hart appeared as a young girl whom McCall protected from her ex-con father. Christian Slater appeared as a high-school student in the episode "Joyride". Kevin Spacey played a corrupt police officer. Ed O'Neill played a doctor in the first-season episode "The Children's Song". John Goodman played a single father who was tricked by co-worker Joe Morton into taking part in a robbery. Goodman's frequent co-star Steve Buscemi appeared in the same episode, which marks the first time the two were on screen together.

Stewart Copeland, who composed the show's theme song and much of its music, made a cameo as a pickpocket. Vincent D'Onofrio appeared twice in the series, playing the arsonist son of a mobster in his first appearance, and a mentally-challenged man falsely accused of murder in his second. Adam Ant played a villain in an episode that also featured J.T. Walsh, David Alan Grier, Lori Petty and Luis Guzmán. Adam Horovitz of the Beastie Boys made a rare acting appearance in an episode alongside Alex Winter. Bradley Whitford appeared as a brutal young thug whose terrorizing of a hitch-hiking young couple leads to a siege of the weaponless McCall and his son who are away on a father-son weekend. Frank Whaley, Sam Rockwell, and Jerry O'Connell appeared in the same episode as members of a teen robbery gang. Shelby Anderson lent her singing ability as a lounge singer in an episode that also involved her giant panda, ZhenZhen. Singer Vitamin C appeared in two episodes under her real name, Colleen Ann Fitzpatrick.

Other well-known stars at the time, as well as future stars, who appeared on the show included Robert Mitchum, Telly Savalas, Tomas Milian (twice), Maureen Stapleton, E. G. Marshall, Laurence Fishburne, Jane Kaczmarek, Lauren Tom, Patricia Clarkson, Jennifer Grey, Reginald VelJohnson, Quentin Crisp, Laurie Metcalf, Frances Fisher, Oliver Platt, Patricia Richardson, William H. Macy, Robin Curtis, Stanley Tucci, Roma Maffia, Olympia Dukakis, Michael Moriarty, Chris Cooper, Michael Rooker, David Strathairn, Charles S. Dutton, Cynthia Nixon, Bruce Payne, Laura San Giacomo, Kasi Lemmons, Al Leong, Ving Rhames, Amanda Plummer, Daniel Davis, Jon Polito, Jasmine Guy, Mark Linn-Baker, Meat Loaf, William Hickey, Lori Loughlin, Michael Wincott, Tony Shalhoub, Anthony Zerbe, Michael Cerveris, William Atherton, Giancarlo Esposito, and the singing duo of Ashford and Simpson.

The series also made good use of its New York City filming location/setting by employing actors who were appearing on Broadway in the late 1980s as guest stars. These included Terrence Mann, Frances Ruffelle, Kevin Conway, J. Smith-Cameron, Philip Bosco, Caitlin Clarke, Josef Sommer, Jim Dale, Christine Baranski, and Anne Twomey.

Additionally, several former stage and screen co-stars of Edward Woodward appeared on the show. These included Brian Bedford, Tammy Grimes (real-life mother of the aforementioned Ms. Plummer), Gwen Verdon, Sandy Dennis, Jenny Agutter, Shirley Knight, and Sylvia Sidney.

Woodward's second wife, Michele Dotrice, appeared as the central character in the season 2 episode, "Heartstrings". Her father, Roy Dotrice, also guest-starred on the show in season 4's "Trial By Ordeal". Edward Woodward's son, actor Tim Woodward, appeared as McCall's father in a flashback scene in the episode "Prisoners of Conscience", also in season 4.

Music

The show's theme music was created by composer/performer Stewart Copeland. The track is called ‘Busy Equalizing’. An extended version appears on his album The Equalizer and Other Cliff Hangers.

Six episodes in the 1988 season were scored by Joseph Conlan and the final season was scored by Cameron Allan. Other episodes were scored by John Cacavas.

Episodes

The show ran for four seasons of 22 episodes each. It was initially renewed for a fifth season (causing Keith Szarabajka to turn down a role on Midnight Caller). However, the show was later canceled due to a row between CBS and Universal Studios over the renewal of Murder, She Wrote.

In The Story of The Equalizer, created for the DVD box set, executive producer Coleman Luck also stated that Universal requested a script for a crossover episode with Magnum, P.I. despite the objections of the crew due to the vastly different tones of the two shows. Ultimately, the crossover did not happen and the episode was re-written as "Beyond Control".

Reception

Television ratings

Critical response
After the broadcast of the first episode in September 1985, the show received mixed reviews. Critic Tom Shales wrote in The Washington Post that "to judge from this very attractively atmospheric premiere, [the show] could become a welcome guest in many an American home". However, for People, Jeff Jarvis wrote, "The plot’s confusing and the show’s as erratic as a pacemaker on low batteries".

Home media
On February 12, 2008, Universal Studios released Season 1 of The Equalizer on DVD in Region 1 (US only).

On May 15, 2013, it was announced that Visual Entertainment had acquired the rights to the series in Region 1. They subsequently released season 2 on DVD on August 26, 2014. Season 3 was released on October 25, 2014, followed by season 4 on November 24, 2014.

Visual Entertainment also released a limited edition complete series set on DVD on August 19, 2014. The Equalizer Complete Collection Limited Edition set contains all 88 episodes plus 12 hours of bonus content including CI5: The New Professionals; the last film ever done by Edward Woodward, A Congregation of Ghosts; and The Story of The Equalizer featuring interviews with cast and crew.

In Region 2, Universal Playback UK released season 1 on DVD on April 21, 2008. In late 2011, Fabulous Films announced that they had acquired the rights to the series. They have subsequently released seasons 2–4. On May 27, 2013, Fabulous Films released The Equalizer: The Complete Collection on DVD. This 24-disc box set contains all 88 episodes of the series as well as bonus content including an all-new documentary featuring interviews with cast and crew.

Many fans have noted that the Region 1 version has had several of the originally used songs replaced. In fact nearly 50 percent of all music apart from the theme and scoring by Stewart Copeland has been replaced by "covers" due to expired music licensing agreements and the costs which would be incurred in the US to have the licensing renewed. In contrast, the Region 2 version contains all of the original music intact.

In Region 4, Umbrella Entertainment has released all four seasons on DVD in Australia.

Adaptations

Film series

A film starring Denzel Washington in the title role, very loosely based upon the series, was released in September 2014. It was followed by a sequel, The Equalizer 2, which was released on July 20, 2018. Melissa Leo, who was a guest star in "The Defector," the third episode of the TV series, appears in both movies.

A third film is in the works with Washington and director Antoine Fuqua returning and filming expected to start in late 2022.

Television series

In November 2019, CBS announced that a reboot is in development with Queen Latifah in the lead role as Robyn McCall. Andrew Marlowe and Terri Miller will serve as showrunners with Latifah herself as an executive producer. On January 27, 2020, CBS issued a pilot order for the new version.

The series was among the 14 pilots ordered by CBS in February 2020 and was fast tracked to series the following March, as they are unable to film their pilots where Universal Television was shut down because of the COVID-19 pandemic.

On May 8, 2020, CBS picked up the series and they added Chris Noth as William Bishop, a quirky ex-CIA director who is the opposite of Latifah. It premiered on February 7, 2021, after Super Bowl LV.

Literature 
A collection of novels featuring Robert McCall has been written by the original co-creator Michael Sloan. The first is simply entitled The Equalizer published in 2014, followed by Killed in Action: An Equalizer Novel, which was released in 2018. The novels are a modern reimagining of the original series and focus on McCall leaving The Company and eventually becoming a private investigator in New York. It also features a number of original recurring characters from the television series such as Mickey Kostmayer, Control, and Scott McCall. A third novel, Equalizer: Requiem was released in 2020.

See also
 Callan, a TV spy series in which Woodward played a character similar to that of The Equalizers Robert McCall.

References

External links
 

1985 American television series debuts
1989 American television series endings
1980s American crime drama television series
CBS original programming
Edgar Award-winning works
Espionage television series
English-language television shows
American detective television series
Fictional secret agents and spies
Fictional vigilantes
Television series by Universal Television
Television shows set in New York City
Television shows adapted into films
Television shows filmed in New York (state)
American action adventure television series
American spy thriller television series
The Equalizer
Vigilante television series